The steamboat Ruth operated from 1896 to 1917 on the Willamette River in the U.S. state of Oregon.  Ruth played an important role in the transport of goods and agricultural products in Oregon, and was one of the fastest steamboats ever to operate on the upper Willamette.  This vessel should not be confused with the sternwheeler Ruth built at Libby, Montana in 1896.

The wheat trade 
Farmers would grow wheat in the Willamette Valley, then bring it by wagon to river ports where it would be bagged and loaded onto steamboats bound downriver to Portland. One of the key centers to the wheat trade was the now-abandoned town of Lincoln, Oregon, in Polk County. Lincoln, was once the most important wheat port on the Willamette, as historian Corning describes:

Operations 
By the 1890s, rail construction in the Willamette Valley had caused a sharp decline in steamboat traffic, as more and more freight was shipped by rail rather than water.  Lincoln remained an exception, and well into the 1890s three steamboats a day called at the town.  The vessels would leave Portland in the morning, pass through the Willamette Locks, and arrive at Lincoln at about 3:00 p.m.  Ruth, when newly launched, was able to beat this time, and under Captain Miles Bell, set what may have been a record time for the Lincoln run, as historian Corning describes:

In addition to the Willamette, Ruth was also worked on the Yamhill River up to Dayton, Oregon.

Steamboat operation was hazardous during this time.  The vessels were endangered by snags and other dangers in the rivers, and even when there was no overall threat to the vessel, the crewmen themselves were at risk.  This was illustrated by an incident involving Ruth which occurred on February 16, 1901, which was investigated by the Portland local office of the Steamboat Inspection Service:

During the fiscal year, there were three other instances in the local Portland District of the Steamboat Inspection Service of crewmen drowning as a result of falling overboard.

Disposition 
The Oregonian newspaper of March 31, 1917 reported that the Ruth was struck by the stern of the newly launched all-steel Vesterlide, the first ship produced by the Northwest Steel shipyard located at the foot of SW Sheridan Street.  The Ruth sank as the result of this collision, and three were injured.

Notes

References 

 Affleck, Edward L., A Century of Paddlewheelers in the Pacific Northwest, the Yukon, and Alaska, Alexander Nicholls Press, Vancouver, BC 2000 
 Corning, Howard McKinley, Willamette Landings, Oregon Historical Society (2d Ed. 1973) 
 Dept. of Commerce and Labor, Annual Report of the Inspector-General of the Steamboat Inspection service, Government Printing Office, Washington, DC 1902
 Timmen, Fritz Blow for the Landing: A Hundred Years of Steam Navigation on the Waters of the West, Caxton Printers, Caldwell, ID 1973

Further reading 
 Mills, Randall V., Sternwheelers up Columbia, Univ. of Nebraska (1947; 1977 printing) 
 Newell, Gordon R., ed., H.W. McCurdy Marine History of the Pacific Northwest, at 48, Superior Publishing, Seattle, WA 1966

External links 

Steamboats of Oregon
Steamboats of the Willamette River
Passenger ships of the United States
Ships built in Oregon
1895 ships
Polk County, Oregon
Yamhill County, Oregon